Steven Harris may refer to:

Steven Harris (wide receiver) (born 1981), American football wide receiver
Steven Harris (defensive tackle) (born 1984), American football defensive tackle for the Denver Broncos
Steven Harris (cartoonist), British born cartoonist
Steven Harris (politician), Idaho State Representative
Steven Harris (Law & Order: Special Victims Unit), a character from the TV series Law & Order: Special Victims Unit
Steven Harris Ramdev, Indian artist and graphics designer

See also
Stephen Harris (disambiguation)
Steve Harris (disambiguation)